The 1953 Hamilton Tiger-Cats finished in 2nd place in the East Division with an 8–6 record and won the Grey Cup over the Winnipeg Blue Bombers. This was their first Grey Cup as the Hamilton Tiger-Cats and the eighth won by teams based in Hamilton.

Preseason

Regular season

Season Standings

Season schedule

Playoffs

Schedule

Grey Cup

References

Hamilton Tiger-Cats seasons
Hamilton
James S. Dixon Trophy championship seasons
Grey Cup championship seasons